Bill Hembree (born March 8, 1966) is a former American politician from Georgia, U.S. Hembree was a Republican member of Georgia House of Representatives for District 67 from 1999 to 2013. Hembree represented parts of Douglas County including the large town of Douglasville and his hometown of Villa Rica.

Career 
As an educator, Hembree was a professor at West Georgia Technical College.

On November 3, 1992, Hembree won the election and became a Republican member of Georgia House of Representatives for District 98. Hembree defeated Thomas "Mac" Kilgore with 56.77% of the votes. On November 8, 1994, as an incumbent,  Hembree won the election and continued serving District 98. Hembree defeated Bryce Williams with 59.60% of the votes.

Personal life 
Hembree's wife is Beth Hembree. They have three children. Hembree and his family live in Douglasville, Georgia.

References

External links 
 Bill Hembree at ballotpedia.org
 Bill Hembree at georgiapol.com

Living people
Republican Party members of the Georgia House of Representatives
21st-century American politicians
1966 births
Candidates in the 2020 United States elections